Helgeroa is a village in Larvik municipality, Norway. It is a popular tourist destination during summers. It is home to a marina, guest harbor, and a harbor for ferries operating in the Langesundsfjord. At the tip of the pier is the 8-meter tall Nesjar Monument.

Before 1988 it was a part of Brunlanes municipality, and has since then grown together with the adjacent village Nevlunghavn. The two villages have a combined population of 1,573.

A toll has been located at Helgeroa since 1639. The need for lodging increased with the surging ship traffic, and Helgeroa's first inn was established in the 1660s. King Christian V stayed at the inn during a visit to Helgeroa in year 1685. Helgeroa is now a popular tourist destination, and large numbers of campgrounds can be found in the immediate nearby area. Helgeroa functioned as a traffic point between Eastern Norway and Southern Norway for hundreds of years.

Geography

Helgeroa lies in a sheltered harbor on the western shore of the Oslo Fjord. Helgeroa was formerly a centre for local commercial traffic across the Langesundsfjord. Today, it is mostly a summer community where tourists often arrive by yachts. All traffic to the islands in the Langesundsfjord, of which some are populated throughout the year, departs from Helgeroa Harbor. The harbor was previously a pilot station, but is now housing a large and well-equipped yachting harbor, as well as oceanside seafood restaurants and bars. It has a shopping center located on the main road.

It was the administrative centre in the municipality of Brunlanes. Despite being permanent home to just a few hundred households, Helgeroa receives thousands of visitors every summer. The Nesjar Monument is located in the village and was erected on the 1000th anniversary for the Battle of Nesjar, which took place by Helgeroa in year 1026.

References

Villages in Vestfold og Telemark
Larvik